Joan Alexander-Serrano (born 1 February 1961) is a Grenadian former cricketer who played as a right-handed batter and right-arm medium bowler. She appeared in one Test match for the West Indies in 1976. She played domestic cricket for Grenada. She went on to play two List A matches for the United States in 2011.

References

External links
 
 

1961 births
Living people
American women cricketers
West Indian women cricketers
West Indies women Test cricketers
Grenadian emigrants to the United States
21st-century American women
Grenadian women cricketers